Sivappu Nila is a 1998 Tamil-language action thriller film directed and produced by J. George Prasad. The film stars Raja and Vineetha, with Vinu Chakravarthy, Vennira Aadai Moorthy, Vadivelu, Delhi Ganesh, Chinni Jayanth and Alex playing supporting roles. It was released on 25 December 1998.

Plot

Raja is a CID inspector of police who is charged to solve the murder of the smuggler Durai. The only clue he would have is that the killer rode a white horse, wore a monster mask and a black coat. In the meantime, Raja falls in love with the soft-spoken college student Raani. He then meets the tomboy Jhansi fighting with some goons who looks exactly like Raani, and she lies to him that she is Raani's twin sister. The same killer murders the smuggler Maruthu. Raja eventually finds the killer, who turns out to be Raani (who is also Jhansi), and Raani tells him about her bitter past.

In the past, Ramachandran was an ex-police officer who lived happily with his two daughters: Lakshmi and Raani. Lakshmi then found a job as a school teacher in the village Ammalur, but Ramachandran didn't want her to go there. A few years ago, Ramachandran clashed with the smuggler Manikkam who severely injured his leg. In spite of his guidance, Lakshmi went to Ammalur alone. Manikkam and his associates Maruthu and Durai spread terror among the villagers. One day, Lakshmi clashes with Manikkam and slapped him. The vengeful Manikkam, Maruthu and Durai then raped Lakshmi in her school in broad daylight. Lakshmi, Raani and Ramachandran lodged a complaint against the rapists, but the court discharged them. Lakshmi immediately committed suicide in the court. Raani and Ramachandran decided to take revenge on the rapists.

Raja advises her to stop it and to surrender to the police, but Raani has to satisfy her thirst for revenge. She finally kills Manikkam in Ammalur, and Raja arrests her. The court then acquitted her due to the lack of evidence.

Cast

Raja as Raja
Vineetha as Raani/Jhansi
Vinu Chakravarthy as Manikkam
Vennira Aadai Moorthy as 'Don't Care' Moorthy
Vadivelu as Thirteen Seventy-Four
Delhi Ganesh as Ramachandran
Chinni Jayanth as Thangappan
Alex as Maruthu
Banerjee as Durai
Loose Mohan as Veerappan
Omakuchi Narasimhan
C. R. Saraswathi as Lawyer
Vahini as Lakshmi
Ilavarasi
Anuja as item number
Junior Rathi
Durga
Mahendran as Muthu Manikkam
Master Azharuddin as Manik Baasha
Rajkanth as Arumugam
Bheemeshwara Rao
V. Sathya Narayana
Judo Ramesh

Soundtrack

The film score and the soundtrack were composed by Deva. The soundtrack, released in 1998, features 5 tracks with lyrics written by Ponniyin Selvan.

References

1998 films
1990s Tamil-language films
Indian action thriller films
Indian rape and revenge films
Films about rape in India
Films scored by Deva (composer)
1998 action thriller films